The Illinois Intercollegiate Football League was a short-lived intercollegiate athletic football conference that existed from 1891 to 1895. As its name suggests, the league's members were located in the state of Illinois. It is unknown which teams won the IIFL football championship during its five seasons in existence.

Champions

 1890 - Illinois (6–0)

See also
List of defunct college football conferences

References

Defunct college sports conferences in the United States
College sports in Illinois